Jerrold Levinson (born 11 July 1948 in Brooklyn) is distinguished university professor of philosophy at the University of Maryland, College Park.  He is particularly noted for his work on the aesthetics of music, as well as for his search for meaning and ontology in film, art and humour.

Education and career
Levinson started his studies in 1965 at the Massachusetts Institute of Technology, where he gained a BS Degree in Philosophy and Chemistry in 1969. He earned his Ph.D. in philosophy at the University of Michigan in 1974, under the supervision of Jaegwon Kim and Kendall Walton.

During 1974–1975, he was visiting assistant professor at SUNY Albany. In 1976 he became assistant professor at the University of Maryland, was promoted to associate professor in 1982 and full professor in 1991. In 2004 he was accorded the title of Distinguished University Professor.  He has also been visiting professor at other US institutes, including the Johns Hopkins University and Columbia University. He has also held visiting appointments in other countries, such as England (University of London and University of Kent), New Zealand (University of Canterbury), France (Université de Rennes), Belgium (Université Libre de Bruxelles), Portugal (Universidade de Lisboa) and Switzerland (Conservatorio della Svizzera Italiana). During 2010-2011 he held an International Francqui Chair  at the Katholieke Universiteit Leuven (Belgium), and in 2011 received the Premio Internazionale of the Società Italiana d'Estetica.

In 2003, Levinson co-directed a National Endowment for the Humanities Summer Institute, Art, Mind, and Cognitive Science, and during 2001-2003 was President of the American Society for Aesthetics.

Philosophical work
Levinson's interest in the aesthetics of music led to an examination of musical ontology from a historical-contextual perspective, and of performance with an emphasis on performing means. He has posited theories of evaluating music and has considered the legitimacy of emotional response in musical appreciation. Within his study of performance he has also examined the distinctness of performing and critical interpretation.

Levinson advocates the position that music has the same relation to thought as does language; 
i.e., if language is an expression of thought, so is music.  This is particularly revealed in his analysis of Wittgenstein's ideas on the meaning in music:
"What Wittgenstein is underscoring here about the appreciation of music is this. Music is not understood in a vacuum, as a pure structure of sounds fallen from the stars, one which we receive via some pure faculty of musical perception. Music is rather inextricably embedded in our form of life, a form of life that is, as it happens, essentially linguistic. Thus music is necessarily apprehended, at least in part, in terms of the language and linguistic practices that define us and our world."
This raises interesting points in the debate on absolute music.

Bibliography
Books:
 Music, Art, and Metaphysics, Ithaca: Cornell UP, 1990; 2nd edition, Oxford: Oxford UP, 2011.
 The Pleasures of Aesthetics, Ithaca: Cornell UP, 1996.
 Music in the Moment, Ithaca: Cornell UP, 1998.
 Aesthetics and Ethics, ed., Cambridge UP, 1998.
 Oxford Handbook of Aesthetics, ed., Oxford UP, 2003.
 Contemplating Art, Oxford: Oxford UP, 2006.
 Musical Concerns, Oxford: Oxford UP, 2015.
 Aesthetic Pursuits, Oxford: Oxford UP, 2016.

Articles/papers:
 "Properties and Related Entities", in Philosophy and Phenomenological Research, 39(1), 1978.
 "The Particularisation of Attributes", in Australasian Journal of Philosophy, 58 (2), 1980
 "What a Musical Work Is", in The Journal of Philosophy, 77(1), 1980.
 "Aesthetic Uniqueness", in The Journal of Aesthetics and Art Criticism, 38(4), 1980.
 "Autographic and Allographic Art Revisited", in Philosophical Studies, 38(4), 1980
 "Truth in Music", in The Journal of Aesthetics and Art Criticism, 40(2), 1981.
 "Gewirth on Absolute Rights", in The Philosophical Quarterly, 32(126), 1982.
 "Hybrid Art Forms", in Journal of Aesthetic Education, 18(4), 1984.
 "Titles", in The Journal of Aesthetics and Art Criticism, 44(1), 1985.
 "Evaluating Musical Performance", in Journal of Aesthetic Education, 21(1), 1987.
 "A Note on Categorical Properties and Contingent Identity", in The Journal of Philosophy, 85(12), 1988.
 "Refining Art Historically", in The Journal of Aesthetics and Art Criticism, 47(1), 1989.
 "Musical Literacy", in Journal of Aesthetic Education, 24(1) Special Issue: Cultural Literacy and Arts Education, 1990.
 "Philosophy as an Art", in Journal of Aesthetic Education, 24(2), 1990.
 "The Place of Real Emotion in Response to Fictions", in The Journal of Aesthetics and Art Criticism, 48(1), 1990.
 "Musical Profundity Misplaced", in The Journal of Aesthetics and Art Criticism, 50(1), 1992.
 "Seeing, Imaginarily, at the Movies", in The Philosophical Quarterly, 43(170), 1993.
 "Extending Art Historically", in The Journal of Aesthetics and Art Criticism, 51(3), 1993.
 "Being Realistic about Aesthetic Properties", in The Journal of Aesthetics and Art Criticism, 52(3), 1994.
 "Still Hopeful: Reply to Karl and Robinson", in The Journal of Aesthetics and Art Criticism, 53(2), 1995.
 "Critical Notice of Malcolm Budd, Values of Art", in Mind, New Series, 105(420), 1996.
 "Wollheim on Pictorial Representation", in The Journal of Aesthetics and Art Criticism, 56(3), 1998.
 "Who's Afraid of a Paraphrase?", in Theoria, 67, 2001.
 "Hume's Standard of Taste: The Real Problem", in The Journal of Aesthetics and Art Criticism, 60(3), 2002.
 "The Irreducible Historicality of the Concept of Art", in British Journal of Aesthetics 42, 2002.
 "The Real Problem Sustained: Reply to Wieand", in The Journal of Aesthetics and Art Criticism, 61(4), 2003.
 "Intrinsic Value and the Notion of a Life", in The Journal of Aesthetics and Art Criticism, 62(4), 2004.
 "Music as Narrative and Music as Drama", in Mind and Language, 19, 2004.
 "Erotic Art and Pornographic Pictures", in Philosophy and Literature, 29, 2005.
 "What Are Aesthetic Properties?", in Proceedings of the Aristotelian Society, Supplement 78, 2005.
 "Concatenationism, Architectonicism, and the Appreciation of Music", in Revue Internationale de Philosophie, 2006.
 "Why There Are No Tropes", in Philosophy, 81, 2006.
 "Musical Expressiveness as Hearability-as-Expression", in Contemporary Debates in Aesthetics, M. Kieran, ed., Blackwell, 2006.
 "Music and Philosophy", in Topoi, 28, 2009
 "The Aesthetic Appreciation of Music", in British Journal of Aesthetics, 49, 2009.

References

University of Maryland, College Park faculty
Philosophers of art
Living people
1948 births
University of Michigan alumni
20th-century American male writers
20th-century American non-fiction writers
20th-century American philosophers
21st-century American non-fiction writers
21st-century American philosophers
American male non-fiction writers
21st-century American male writers